The Calgary Kookaburras is a ladies Australian rules football club based in Calgary, Alberta, Canada. They play at the Queen Elizabeth School, Hillhurst and are members of AFL Canada.  They were the first women's football club formed in Canada.

History
The Calgary Kookaburras were formed on April 30, 2007, at a meeting of five girls at Hillhurst's Riley Park.  Jake Anson was appointed as the club's inaugural coach, with Bri Johnstone as the club's first captain.

The first major tournament that club members participated in was the first women's international matches of Australian football, held at Vancouver's Thunderbird Stadium on August 4 & 5. Fourteen Calgary Kookaburras represented Canada in matches against the USA national team.

The club continued to gain momentum on- and off-field throughout 2007. The club developed an independent club structure in August, to focus on growing women's Australian football throughout southern Alberta.  In October, the club was invited to compete in the US National Championships, held in Louisville, Kentucky.  The Calgary squad combined with women from the Washington First Lady Eagles to compete in the championships.  The combined team lost three official matches against Arizona, Milwaukee and Atlanta.  In an unofficial match, Calgary 6.7 (43) defeated Washington 4.2 (26).

In 2008, a full pre-season and some innovative recruiting saw the club grow to become the largest women's footy team outside Australia. Two feeder clubs were formed to provide regular match practice for players and the club's profile in the Calgary community grew through exposure in the press and on television. In October the club again competed in the US National Championships, held in Colorado Springs, Colorado. The squad performed outstandingly and went through the tournament undefeated to become only the second women's football club to win the championship.  Calgary 4.3 (27) defeated Atlanta 3.4 (22) in the final.

In 2011 the Calgary Kookaburras again traveled to the United States to compete in the 2011 Nationals held in Austin, Texas and hosted by the United States Australian Football League. Coach Holly Greatwich, formally of the Bridgetown Bulldogs and a previous, fierce player for the Kookaburras, will make history at the tournament when she becomes the first ever female coach of an international women's AFL team.

Tournament Championships
Alberta Cup (Gaelic Football) Champions Calgary, AB - 2007

US National Champions Colorado Springs, CO - 2008

Canadian National Champions Vancouver, BC - 2009

Feeder Clubs
The Alberta Footy Women's League was formed in 2008 to provide intra-club competition for the Calgary Kookaburras representative team. Calgary currently fields two sides in the competition:
 Hillhurst Nighthawks
 Kensington Kingfishers

See also

External links
 Calgary Kookaburras

Kookaburras
Australian rules football clubs established in 2007
2007 establishments in Alberta
Australian rules football clubs in Canada
Women's Australian rules football clubs